I Remember Blind Joe Death is an album by American fingerstyle guitarist and composer John Fahey, released in 1987.

This album was later disregarded by Fahey, stating the album suffers from sloppy playing due to the Epstein–Barr virus he was suffering from at the time.

Reception

CMJ New Music wrote that "The record is rooted in a deep delta blues sound-but that's certainly not where it ends.. Fabulous."

Track listing
 "The Evening Mysteries of Ferry Street" (Fahey) – 3:28
 "You'll Find Her Name Written There" (Harold Hensley) – 1:36
 "The Minutes Seem Like Hours, The Hours Seem Like Days" (Fahey) – 4:02
 "Are You from Dixie?" (Traditional) – 2:45
 "A Minor Blues" (Traditional) – 4:42
 "Steel Guitar Rag" (Traditional) – 2:26
 "Nightmare/Summertime" (Artie Shaw, George Gershwin, Ira Gershwin, DuBose Heyward, Dorothy Heyward) – 5:25
 "Let Me Call You Sweetheart" (Beth Slater Whitson, Leo Friedman) – 2:12
 "Unknown Tango" (Traditional) – 3:54
 "Improv in E Minor" (Fahey) – 7:31
 "Lava on Waikiki" (Fahey) – 2:18
 "Gaucho" (Bola Sete) – 6:00

Personnel
John Fahey – guitar
Production notes
Tinh Mahoney – producer
Mike Moore – engineer
Tom Coyne – mastering
Susan Marsh – design

References

1987 albums
John Fahey (musician) albums